Francesco Severi (13 April 1879 – 8 December 1961) was an Italian mathematician. He was the chair of the committee on Fields Medal on 1936, at the first delivery.

Severi was born in Arezzo, Italy. He is famous for his contributions to algebraic geometry and the theory of functions of several complex variables. He became the effective leader of the Italian school of algebraic geometry. Together with Federigo Enriques, he won the Bordin prize from the French Academy of Sciences.

He contributed in a major way to birational geometry, the theory of algebraic surfaces, in particular of the curves lying on them, the theory of moduli spaces and the theory of functions of several complex variables. He wrote prolifically, and some of his work (following the intuition-led approach of Federigo Enriques) has subsequently been shown to be not rigorous according to the then new standards set in particular by Oscar Zariski and Andre Weil. Although many of his arguments have since been made rigorous, a significant fraction were not only lacking in rigor but also wrong (in contrast to the work of Enriques, which though not rigorous was almost entirely correct). At the personal level, according to  he was easily offended, and he was involved in a number of controversies. Most notably, he was a staunch supporter of the Italian fascist regime of Benito Mussolini and was included on a committee of academics that was to conduct an anti-semitic purge of all scholarly societies and academic institutions.

Selected publications 
All the mathematical works of Francesco Severi, except all books, are collected in the six volumes of his "Opere Matematiche".
, available at Gallica. The paper containing the first proof of Morera's theorem for holomorphic functions of several variables.
. The announce of the solution of the Dirichlet problem for pluriharmonic functions for domains with real analytic boundaries.
. In this paper Severi describes the "passage from real to complex" method he developed in order to deal with several problems in the theory of functions of several complex variables.
. In this work Severi gives his proof of the Hartogs' extension theorem.
. Notes from a course held by Francesco Severi at the Istituto Nazionale di Alta Matematica (which at present bears his name), containing appendices of Enzo Martinelli, Giovanni Battista Rizza and Mario Benedicty.
 (available from the "Edizione Nazionale Mathematica Italiana"). His "Mathematical works, Memoirs and Notes": the complete collection, with the exception of books, of Francesco Severi's scientific contributions. The reprinted works, written in Italian, French, German, retain their original language in an improved typographical form amended from typographical errors and author's oversights: also, a comment of Severi was added to several papers. Volume I collects works published from 1900 to 1908.
 (available from the "Edizione Nazionale Mathematica Italiana"). His "Mathematical works, Memoirs and Notes": the complete collection, with the exception of books, of Francesco Severi's scientific contributions. The reprinted works, written in Italian, French, German, retain their original language in an improved typographical form amended from typographical errors and author's oversights: also, a comment of Severi was added to several papers. Volume II collects works published from 1909 to 1917.
 (available from the "Edizione Nazionale Mathematica Italiana"). His "Mathematical works, Memoirs and Notes": the complete collection, with the exception of books, of Francesco Severi's scientific contributions. The reprinted works, written in Italian, French, German, retain their original language in an improved typographical form amended from typographical errors and author's oversights: also, a comment of Severi was added to several papers. Volume III collects works published from 1918 to 1932.
 (available from the "Edizione Nazionale Mathematica Italiana"). His "Mathematical works, Memoirs and Notes": the complete collection, with the exception of books, of Francesco Severi's scientific contributions. The reprinted works, written in Italian, French, German, retain their original language in an improved typographical form amended from typographical errors and author's oversights: also, a comment of Severi was added to several papers. Volume IV collects works published from 1933 to 1941.
 (available from the "Edizione Nazionale Mathematica Italiana"). His "Mathematical works, Memoirs and Notes": the complete collection, with the exception of books, of Francesco Severi's scientific contributions. The reprinted works, written in Italian, French, German, retain their original language in an improved typographical form amended from typographical errors and author's oversights: also, a comment of Severi was added to several papers. Volume V collects works published from 1942 to 1948.
 (available from the "Edizione Nazionale Mathematica Italiana"). His "Mathematical works, Memoirs and Notes": the complete collection, with the exception of books, of Francesco Severi's scientific contributions. The reprinted works, written in Italian, French, German, retain their original language in an improved typographical form amended from typographical errors and author's oversights: also, a comment of Severi was added to several papers.  Volume VI collects works published from 1949 to 1961.

Articles on Scientia 
  Ipotesi e realta nelle scienze geometriche, Scientia: rivista internazionale di sintesi scientifica, 8, 1910, pp. 1–29
  Esame delle obiezioni d'ordine generale contro la relatività del tempo, Scientia: rivista internazionale di sintesi scientifica, 37, 1925, pp. 77–86
  Elementi logici e psicologici dei principi di relatività, Scientia: rivista internazionale di sintesi scientifica, 37, 1925, pp. 1–10
  Materia e causalità, energia e indeterminazione, Scientia: rivista internazionale di sintesi scientifica, 81, 1947, pp. 49–59
  Leonardo e la matematica, Scientia: rivista internazionale di sintesi scientifica, 88, 1953, pp. 41–44
  I fondamenti logici della relatività, Scientia: rivista internazionale di sintesi scientifica, 90, 1955, pp. 277–282
  La matematica nella prima metà del secolo XX, Scientia: rivista internazionale di sintesi scientifica, 92, 1957, pp. 20–26

Reviews 
  Albert Einstein, L'ether et la theorie de la relativité, Scientia: rivista internazionale di sintesi scientifica, 91, 1956, pp. 42–43
  Eric Temple Bell, Les mathematiques reines et servantes des sciences, Scientia: rivista internazionale di sintesi scientifica, 90, 1955, pp. 371–372
  Nikolaus Von Cues, Die Mathematische Schriften, Scientia: rivista internazionale di sintesi scientifica, 89, 1954, pp. 34–34
  Ludovico Geymonat, Saggi di Filosofia neorazionalista, Scientia: rivista internazionale di sintesi scientifica, 89, 1954, pp. 176–176
  Norbert Wiener, Introduzione alla cibernetica, Scientia: rivista internazionale di sintesi scientifica, 88, 1953, pp. 312–313
  Eric Temple Bell, I grandi Matematici, Scientia: rivista internazionale di sintesi scientifica, 86, 1951, pp. 183–184
  Richard Courant e Herbert Robbins, Che cos'è la matematica?, Scientia: rivista internazionale di sintesi scientifica, 86, 1951, pp. 278–279
  Gottlob Frege, Aritmetica e Logica, Scientia: rivista internazionale di sintesi scientifica, 84, 1949, pp. 144–144

See also 
Istituto Nazionale di Alta Matematica Francesco Severi
Italian school of algebraic geometry
Morera's theorem
Néron–Severi group
Pluriharmonic function
Several complex variables
Severi–Brauer variety

References

Biographical and general references 
. The "Yearbook" of the renowned Italian scientific institution, including an historical sketch of its history, the list of all past and present members as well as a wealth of information about its academic and scientific activities.
.
.
.
.
, available at Gallica. A detailed description of the Bordin prize winning work of Francesco Severi and Federigo Enriques. 
.
.
. A report of the fourth International Congress of Mathematicians with a short exposition of the motivation for the awarding of the Guccia medal to Severi.
. The relation by Max Noether, Henri Poincaré and Corrado Segre on the motivation for the awarding of the Guccia medal to Severi, read during the fourth International Congress of Mathematicians.
.
.
.
. A description of the scientific work done under the direction of Severi at the "Istituto Nazionale di Alta Matematica during the early forties of the twentieth century, by one of his former doctoral students.

Scientific references
. The "Proceedings of the mathematical conference for the celebration of the centenary of the birth of Guido Fubini and Francesco Severi",  including several research as well as historical papers describing the contributions of Guido Fubini and Fracesco Severi to various branches of pure and applied mathematics: the conference was held on 8–10 October 1979 at the Accademia delle Scienze di Torino.
. In the paper "The contributions of Guido Fubini and Francesco Severi to the theory of functions of several complex variables" (English translation of the title), Gaetano Fichera describes the main contributions of the two scientists to the Cauchy and the Dirichlet problem for holomorphic functions of several complex variables, as well as the impact of their work on subsequent researches.
. "The Severi and Severi–Kneser theorems for analytic functions of several complex variables and their further developments" (English translation of the title) is an historical survey paper on the Cauchy and the Dirichlet problem for holomorphic functions of several complex variables, updating the earlier work .
. This paper, included in the Proceedings of the Study Meeting in Memory of Giuseppe Gemignani, is an account of the failures of Vito Volterra, Leonida Tonelli and Francesco Severi, when dealing with particular research problems during their career. An English translation of the title reads as:-"Three battles lost by three great Italian mathematicians".
. In the paper "The thought of Einstein in the work of Guido Fubini and Francesco Severi" (English translation of the title), Dionigi Galletto describes the main contributions of the two scientists to special and general relativity. 
. In this paper, R. Michael Range corrects some inexact historical statements in the theory of holomorphic functions of several variables, particularly concerning contributions of Gaetano Fichera and Francesco Severi.
. An historical paper exploring further the same topic previously dealt in the paper  by the same author.

External links 

: a very short biography of Severi, with a complete bibliography of his works, available at the "Geometria algebrica italiana (Italian algebraic geometry) " web site.
 Contains also 12 further references.
: a short résumé of his life available at the "".
. Available from the Edizione Nazionale Mathematica Italiana.
. The web site of the institute Francesco Severi founded.
.

1879 births
1961 deaths
20th-century Italian mathematicians
20th-century Roman Catholics
Algebraic geometers
Italian algebraic geometers
Complex analysts
Mathematical analysts
Members of the Royal Academy of Italy
Members of the Lincean Academy
People from Arezzo